The Himachal Pradesh Rural Cricket League (HPRCL) is a Twenty20 Cricket League. Founded in 2011, HPRCL is associated with the Indian Premier Corporate League and Indian Twenty20 Cricket Federation, and aims to provide a platform for talented but poor cricket players from rural and remote areas.

Shri Narinder Verma is the First Director of the Himachal Pradesh Rural Cricket League.

Teams
 Ghannahatti Gladiators
 Chopal Sultans of Speed
 Rampur Dashing Dudes
 Dhundan Typhoons
 Kinnauri Icicles
 Sunni Panthers
 Junga Jaguars
 Arki Rajputana's
 Theog Hawks
 Kotkhai Cowboys
 Jubbal Royals
 Rohru Blasters
 Kasauli Go-n-Getters
 Darla Dominators
 Palampur Pythons
 Manali Invincibles
 Rajghari Cheetas
 Sujanpur Bulls
 Bajaura Tornados
 Sundernagar Dragons
 Karsog Big Bullets

Team managers - 2011

Director of HPRCL
The post of Director of HPRCL is the most prestigious post in the HPRCL.

History
Himachal Pradesh Rural Cricket League was founded in 2011.

Tournaments and trophies - 2011 
 HPRCL - 2011 (29 December 2011 to 31 December 2011)
HPRCL - 2011, the title Trophy was won by Ghannahatti Gladiators under captain Shri Praveen Chauhan. Ghannahatti Gladiators bowled out Dhundan Typhoons with a score of 49 and got a score of 50 with 2 wickets down in just 5 overs. Shri Mohd Abid (Dhundan Typhoons) got Man of the Tournament Trophy, Shri Praveen Chauhan(Ghannahati Gladiators) won best Batsman of the Tournament and Shri Manoj Kumar(Ghannahati Gladiators) won best Bowler of the Tournament.

 Lt. Surat Ram Rajta Memorial Trophy (20 August 2011 to 22 August 2011)
LSRR Memorial Trophy, won by Chopal Sultans of Speed under captain Shri Praveen Dogra.

References

External links 
 Official website of Himachal Pradesh Rural Cricket League
 Official website of Indian Premier Cricket League
 Official website of Indian Twenty20 Cricket Federation
 HP State Newspapers Dainik Bhaskar, Divya Himachal, Dainik Jagran on 19 September 2011

Twenty20 cricket leagues
Cricket in Himachal Pradesh